Jaffe and its variant spellings Jaffé and Yaffe  are Hebrew-language surnames. 

The surname was recorded in Prague in the 16th century. It was recorded in the United Kingdom in the 1881 census, mostly in London.

The Jaffe family (Hebrew: יפה) is a distinguished Ashkenazi Jewish Rabbinic family, members of which have produced numerous famous rabbis, court Jews, Talmudic scholars, scientists, businessmen, academics and politicians.

Other notable people with this surname include:

 Aaron Jaffe, American politician
 Allan Jaffe, American jazz musician
 Andrew Jaffe, journalist
 Aniela Jaffé, (1903–1991), Swiss analyst who was a co-worker of Carl Jung
 Arthur Jaffe, American mathematical physicist
 Ben Jaffe, American jazz musician
 Billy Jaffe (born 1969), color analyst for the Boston Bruins on NESN
 Chapelle Jaffe, Canadian actress
 Charles Jaffe (c. 1879–1941), Belarusian-American chess master
 Charles Jaffe (conductor) (c. 1917–2011), American conductor and musical director
 Daniel Jaffe, American astronomer
 David Jaffe, American video game designer and director
 David Yaffe, music critic
 David A. Jaffe, American composer of contemporary classical and electronic/computer music
 Deborah Yaffe, author
 Dov Yaffe (1928–2017), Lithuanian-born Israeli rabbi
 Elaine Jaffe, American pathologist, expert in hematopathology
 Eliezer Jaffe, Israeli professor
 Elisha Yaffe, comedian, actor and writer
Eyal Yaffe (born 1960), Israeli basketball player
 Francois Jouffa (born 1943), French journalist
 Frederick S. Jaffe, (1925–1978), vice president of Planned Parenthood and founder of the Guttmacher Institute
 Herb Jaffe (1921–1991), American film producer
 Jerome H. Jaffe, psychiatrist
 Joseph Joffo, French writer 
 Leib Yaffe, Hebrew poet, journalist and editor
 Leo Yaffe, Canadian nuclear chemistry scientist
 Louis Isaac Jaffe (1888-1950), American journalist
 Marielle Jaffe (born 1989), American model and actress
 Matt Jaffe (born 1995), American singer-songwriter
 Maurice Yaffé, British psychologist
 Max Jaffa, born Max Jaffe, British violinist and bandleader
 Michael Jaffé (1923–1997), British art historian and curator
 Michael Muir Jaffe (born 1945), American television producer
 Michael B. Yaffe, scientific editor
 Moe Jaffe (1901–1972), American songwriter and band leader
 Naomi Jaffe, activist
 Nat Jaffe, American jazz pianist
 Nicole Jaffe, American actress
 Norman Jaffe, American architect
 Sir Otto Jaffe (born 1846), German-born British Jewish businessman, High Sheriff and Lord Mayor of Belfast
 Peter Jaffe (born 1913), British sailor and Olympic silver medalist
 Philipp Jaffé (1819–1870), German historian and philologist
 Philip Jaffe (1895–1980), American left-wing editor and writer
 Richard Yaffe, Journalist
 Rivke Jaffe (born 1978), Dutch anthropologist and professor
 Robert Jaffe, American physicist and professor
 Robert Jaffe (stockbroker) (born 1944), American associate of Bernard Madoff
 Rona Jaffe (born 1932), American author
 Sam Jaffe (actor) (1891–1984), American film actor
 Sam Jaffe (producer) (1901–2000), American film producer later in England
 Sarah Jaffe (born 1986), American singer-songwriter
 Scott Jaffe (born 1969), American freestyle swimmer
 Stanley R. Jaffe (born 1940), American film producer
 Stephen Jaffe, American composer
 Taliesin Jaffe, (born 1977), American voice actor
 Theodor Julius Jaffé (1823–1898), German actor
 Werner Jaffé (1914–2009), German chemist and university professor
 Yves Jouffa (1920-1999), French lawyer

See also 
 Jaffee
 Joffe
Yoffe
Ioffe

References 

Jewish surnames
Hebrew-language surnames
Yiddish-language surnames